In machine learning, a tensor is a way of representing high-dimensional data in a multi-dimensional array (data type) suitable for artificial neural networks or multilinear component analysis. Tensors are able to represent images, movies, volumes, sounds, and relationships among words and concepts in a unified way.

Operations on tensors can be expressed in terms of matrix multiplication and the Kronecker product. With tensor decomposition, tensors can be factorized into smaller tensors, which enable networks with many fewer parameters. The computation of gradients, an important aspect of the backpropagation algorithm, can be performed through tensors in a consistent way that enables unified frameworks such as PyTorch and TensorFlow.

Computations are often performed on graphics processing units (GPUs) using CUDA and on dedicated hardware such as Google's Tensor Processing Unit or Nvidia's Tensor core. These developments have greatly accelerated neural network architectures and increased the size and complexity of models that can be trained.

History
A tensor is by definition a multilinear map. In mathematics, this may express a multilinear relationship between sets of algebraic objects. In physics, tensor fields, considered as tensors at each point in space, are useful in expressing mechanics such as stress or elasticity. In machine learning, the exact use of tensors depends on the statistical approach being used.

In 2001, the closely related fields of statistics and signal processing were making use of tensors. Pierre Comon surveys the early adoption of tensors, which were found in telecommunications, radio surveillance, chemometrics and sensor processing. He noted several early limitations; especially determining tensor rank and efficient tensor decomposition. 

In 2002, using the methods of multilinear principal component analysis (MPCA) the work of Vasilescu & Terzopoulous, called TensorFaces, made use of tensors in facial recognition. The multilinear nature of tensors disentangle the causal factors of data. . Vectorized observations such as lighting, orientation and facial expressions in images of people are collected into separate tensors to capture the interaction between these factors.

By 2005, Wang and Ahuja found an efficient tensor approximation for arbitrary rank to reduce the dimensionality of images. 

In the early 2000s, the field of multilinear subspace learning was established to focus specifically on dimensionality reduction of data sets by using tensors.
 

One of the first uses of tensors for neural networks appeared in natural language processing. A single word can be expressed as a vector via Word2vec. Thus a relationship between two words can be encoded in a matrix. However, for more complex relationships such as subject-object-verb, it is necessary to build higher-dimensional networks. In 2009, the work of Sutsekver introduced Bayesian Clustered Tensor Factorization to model relational concepts while reducing the parameter space.

From 2014-2015, tensors become more common in convolutional neural networks (CNNs). Vadim et al. accelerated CNN networks for character classification (the recognition of letters and digits in images) by using 4D kernel tensors.  Fully tensor-based approaches could be used to represent images and video generally.

By 2015, the idea that tensors could become a fundamental unit for deep neural networks was taking shape due to their generality to multi-dimensional data, and as a way to reduce computation via efficient tensor decomposition.

Definition
Let  be a field such as the real numbers  or the complex numbers . A tensor  is an  array over :
 

One basic approach (not the only way) to using tensors in machine learning is to embed various data types directly. For example, a grayscale image, commonly represented as a discrete 2D function  with resolution  may be embedded in a mode-2 tensor as
  
A color image with 3 channels for RGB might be embedded in a mode-3 tensor with three elements in an additional dimension:
 
In natural language processing, a word might be expressed as a vector  via the Word2vec algorithm. Thus  becomes a mode-1 tensor
 
The embedding of subject-object-verb semantics requires embedding relationships among three words. Because a word is itself a vector, subject-object-verb semantics could be expressed using mode-3 tensors
 

In practice the neural network designer is primarily concerned with the specification of embeddings, the connection of tensor layers, and the operations performed on them in a network. Modern machine learning frameworks manage the optimization, tensor factorization and backpropagation automatically.

As unit values

Tensors may be used as the unit values of neural networks which extend the concept of scalar, vector and matrix values to multiple dimensions.

The output value of single layer unit  is the sum-product of its input units and the connection weights filtered through the activation function :
 
where

By replacing each unit component with a tensor, the network is able to express higher dimensional data such as images or videos:
 

This use of tensors to replace unit values is common in convolutional neural networks where each unit might be an image processed through multiple layers. By embedding the data in tensors such network structures enable learning of complex data types.

In fully connected layers

Tensors may also be used to compute the layers of a fully connected neural network, where the tensor is applied to the entire layer instead of individual unit values.

The output value of single layer unit  is the sum-product of its input units and the connection weights filtered through the activation function :
 
In this example the unit values are scalars while the tensor takes on the dimensions of the network layers:
 
 
 
In this notation, the output values can be computed as a tensor product of the input and weight tensors:
 
which computes the sum-product as a tensor multiplication (similar to matrix multiplication).

This formulation of tensors enables the entire layer of a fully connected network to be efficiently computed by mapping the units and weights to tensors.

In convolutional layers
A different reformulation of neural networks allows tensors to express the convolution layers of a neural network. A convolutional layer has multiple inputs, each of which is a spatial structure such as an image or volume. The inputs are convolved by filtering before being passed to the next layer. A typical use is to perform feature detection or isolation in image recognition.

Convolution is often computed as the multiplication of an input signal  with a filter kernel . In two dimensions the discrete, finite form is:
 
where  is the width of the kernel. 

This definition can be rephrased as a matrix-vector product in terms of tensors that express the kernel, data and inverse transform of the kernel.
 
The derivation is more complex when the filtering kernel also includes a non-linear activation function such as sigmoid or ReLU.

The hidden weights of the convolution layer are the parameters to the filter. These can be reduced with a pooling layer which reduces the resolution (size) of the data, and can also be expressed as a tensor operation.

Design of tensor frameworks
The design of tensor frameworks has enabled machine learning modelers to build neural networks without knowing the details of tensors or backpropagation. With the development of unified frameworks such as PyTorch and TensorFlow, the construction of neural networks from the bottom up, including backpropagation and optimization, are not typically undertaken by most modelers. These frameworks support automatic differentiation, which computes the gradients of the learning loss function through multiple layers of a complex tensor network.

The construction of tensor frameworks requires a deeper understanding of this optimization process in neural network learning. These topics are relevant to framework developers but are not strictly necessary for network modelers to understand when using common tensor frameworks.

Backpropagation through tensors
The backpropagation algorithm computes the gradients of a loss function through multiple layers of a neural network. The loss function  is typically defined as the error between the input data and network output over a training set. To develop tensor-based frameworks, it is necessary to define the backpropagation step over tensors as well.

Since tensors are the element-wise extension of vectors and matrices to multiple dimensions, derivatives can also be performed element-wise over tensors. The tensor object defines the partial derivatives over inputs, outputs and weights. Tensor objects, like scalars, can be chained through repeated application of the chain rule.

Tensor factorization
An important contribution of tensors in machine learning is the ability to factorize tensors to reduce the number of elements or parameters to be learned. This is a form of data reduction which preserves the meaning of the data by making use of the rank of the tensor to eliminate redundancies in the data. There are several different types of decomposition.

Tucker decomposition

Tucker decomposition takes a tensor, for example a 3-mode tensor
  
and decomposes the tensor into three matrices  and a smaller tensor . The shape of the matrices and new tensor are such that the total number of elements is reduced. The new tensors have shapes
  
  
  
 
Then the original tensor can be expressed as the tensor product of these four tensors:
 

In the example shown in the figure, the dimensions of the tensors are
 : I=8, J=6, K=3, : I=8, P=5, : J=6, Q=4, : K=3, R=2, : P=5, Q=4, R=2.
The total number of elements in the Tucker factorization is
 
 

The number of elements in the original  is 144, resulting in a data reduction from 144 down to 110 elements, a reduction of 23% in parameters or data size. For much larger initial tensors, and depending on the rank (redundancy) of the tensor, the gains can be more significant.

The work of Rabanser et al. provides an introduction to tensors with more details on the extension of Tucker decomposition to N-dimensions beyond the mode-3 example given here.

Tensor trains
Another technique for decomposing tensors rewrites the initial tensor as a sequence (train) of smaller sized tensors. A tensor-train (TT) is a sequence of tensors of reduced rank, called canonical factors. The original tensor can be expressed as the sum-product of the sequence.

 

Developed in 2011 by Ivan Oseledts, the author observes that Tucker decomposition is "suitable for small dimensions, especially for the three-dimensional case. For large d it is not suitable." Thus tensor-trains can be used to factorize larger tensors in higher dimensions.

Tensor graphs
The unified data architecture and automatic differentiation of tensors has enabled higher-level designs of machine learning in the form of tensor graphs. This leads to new architectures, such as tensor-graph convolutional networks (TGCN), which identify highly non-linear associations in data, combine multiple relations, and scale gracefully, while remaining robust and performant.

These development are impacting all areas of machine learning, such as text mining and clustering, time varying data, and neural networks where the input data is a social graph in and the data changes dynamically.

Hardware
Tensors provide a unified way to train neural networks for more complex data sets. However, training is expensive to compute on classical CPU hardware.

In 2014, Nvidia developed cuDNN, CUDA Deep Neural Network, a library for a set of optimized primitives written in the parallel CUDA language. CUDA and thus cuDNN run on dedicated GPUs that implement unified massive parallelism in hardware. These GPUs were not yet dedicated chips for tensors, but rather existing hardware adapted for parallel computation in machine learning.

From 2015-2017, Google invented the Tensor Processing Unit (TPU). TPUs are dedicated, fixed function hardware units that specialize in the matrix multiplications needed for tensor products. Specifically, they implement an array of 65,536 multiply units that can perform a 256x256 matrix sum-product in just one global instruction cycle.

Later in 2017, Nvidia released its own Tensor Core with the Volta GPU architecture. Each Tensor Core is a microunit that can perform a 4x4 matrix sum-product. There are eight tensor cores for each shared memory (SM) block. The first GV100 GPU card has 108 SMs resulting in 672 tensor cores. This device accelerated machine learning by 12x over the previous Tesla GPUs. The number of tensor cores scales as the number of cores and SM units continue to grow in each new generation of cards.

The development of GPU hardware, combined with the unified architecture of tensor cores, has enabled the training of much larger neural networks. As of 2022, the largest neural network was GPT-3, a language model with over 175 billion learned parameters (network weights) that produces human-like text. The widely popular chatbot ChatGPT is built on top of GPT-3 using supervised and reinforcement learning.

References

Machine learning
Tensors